In computer science, syntactic sugar is syntax within a programming language that is designed to make things easier to read or to express. It makes the language "sweeter" for human use: things can be expressed more clearly, more concisely, or in an alternative style that some may prefer. Syntactic sugar is usually a shorthand for a common operation that could also be expressed in an alternate, more verbose, form: The programmer has a choice of whether to use the shorter form or the longer form, but will usually use the shorter form since it is shorter and easier to type and read.

For example, many programming languages provide special syntax for referencing and updating array elements. Abstractly, an array reference is a procedure of two arguments: an array and a subscript vector, which could be expressed as get_array(Array, vector(i,j)). Instead, many languages provide syntax such as Array[i,j]. Similarly an array element update is a procedure consisting of three arguments, for example set_array(Array, vector(i,j), value), but many languages also provide syntax such as Array[i,j] = value.

A construct in a language is syntactic sugar if it can be removed from the language without any effect on what the language can do: functionality and expressive power will remain the same.

Language processors, including compilers and static analyzers, often expand sugared constructs into their more verbose equivalents before processing, a process sometimes called "desugaring".

Origins 
The term syntactic sugar was coined by Peter J. Landin in 1964 to describe the surface syntax of a simple ALGOL-like programming language which was defined semantically in terms of the applicative expressions of lambda calculus, centered on lexically replacing λ with "where".

Later programming languages, such as CLU, ML and Scheme, extended the term to refer to syntax within a language which could be defined in terms of a language core of essential constructs; the convenient, higher-level features could be "desugared" and decomposed into that subset. This is, in fact, the usual mathematical practice of building up from primitives.

Building on Landin's distinction between essential language constructs and syntactic sugar, in 1991, Matthias Felleisen proposed a codification of "expressive power" to align with "widely held beliefs" in the literature. He defined "more expressive" to mean that without the language constructs in question, a program would have to be completely reorganized.

Notable examples 
 In COBOL, many of the intermediate keywords are syntactic sugar that may optionally be omitted. For example, the sentence MOVE A B. and the sentence MOVE A TO B. perform exactly the same function, but the second makes the action to be performed clearer.
 Augmented assignment or compound assignment operators: For example, a += b is equivalent to a = a + b in C and similar languages, assuming a has no side effects such as if a is a regular variable. Some languages, such as Python may allow overloading augmented assignment operators, so they may behave differently than standard ones.
 In Perl, unless (condition) {...}  is syntactic sugar for if (not condition) {...}. Additionally, any statement can be followed by a condition, so statement if condition is equivalent to if (condition) {statement}, but the former is more naturally formatted on a single line.
 In the C language, the a[i] notation is syntactic sugar for *(a + i). Likewise, the a->x notation is syntactic sugar for accessing members using the dereference operator (*a).x.
 The using statement in C# ensures that certain objects are disposed of correctly. The compiler expands the statement into a try-finally block.
 The C# language allows variables to be declared as var x = expr, which allows the compiler to infer the type of x from the expression expr, instead of requiring an explicit type declaration. Similarly, C++ allows auto x = expr since C++11 and Java allows var x = expr since Java 11.
 Python list comprehensions (such as [x*x for x in range(10)] for a list of squares) and decorators (such as @staticmethod).
 In Haskell, a string, denoted in quotation marks, is semantically equivalent to a list of characters.
 In the tidyverse collection of R packages, the pipe, denoted by %>%, declares that the data (or output of the function) preceding the pipe will serve as the first argument for the function following the pipe. So, x %>% f(y) is equivalent to f(x,y).
 In SQL, a mere JOIN is equivalent to an INNER JOIN, the latter clarifying that the join statement is specifically an inner join operation as opposed to an outer join operation. Likewise, you may omit the OUTER from the LEFT OUTER JOIN, RIGHT OUTER JOIN and FULL OUTER JOIN.
Method calling in OOP languages in the form of myObject.myMethod(parameter1, parameter2, parameter3) is syntactic sugar for calling a global function as myMethod(myObject, parameter1, parameter2, parameter3). The reference to the object is passed as a hidden argument, usually accessible from within the method as this.
A parameter called by reference is syntactic sugar for technically passing a pointer as the parameter, but syntactically handling it as the variable itself, to avoid constant pointer de-referencing in the code inside the function.
 In Java, an import declaration enables the compiler to find classes that are not otherwise specified with fully qualified names. For example import javax.swing.*; allows the programmer to reference a Swing object such as javax.swing.JButton using the shorter name JButton.

Criticism 
Some programmers feel that these syntax usability features are either unimportant or outright frivolous. Notably, special syntactic forms make a language less uniform and its specification more complex, and may cause problems as programs become large and complex. This view is particularly widespread in the Lisp community, as Lisp has very simple and regular syntax, and the surface syntax can easily be modified.
For example, Alan Perlis once quipped in "Epigrams on Programming", in a reference to bracket-delimited languages, that "Syntactic sugar causes cancer of the semi-colons".

Derivative terms

Syntactic salt 
The metaphor has been extended by coining the term syntactic salt, which indicates a feature designed to make it harder to write bad code. Specifically, syntactic salt is a hoop that programmers must jump through just to prove that they know what is going on, rather than to express a program action. For example, in Java and Pascal assigning a float value to a variable declared as an int without additional syntax explicitly stating that intention will result in a compile error, while C and C++ will automatically truncate any floats assigned to an int. However this is not syntax, but semantics.

In C#, when hiding an inherited class member, a compiler warning is issued unless the new keyword is used to specify that the hiding is intentional. To avoid potential bugs owing to the similarity of the switch statement syntax with that of C or C++, C# requires a break for each non-empty case label of a switch (unless goto, return, or throw is used) even though it does not allow implicit fall-through. (Using goto and specifying the subsequent label produces a C/C++-like fall-through.)

Syntactic salt may defeat its purpose by making the code unreadable and thus worsen its quality – in extreme cases, the essential part of the code may be shorter than the overhead introduced to satisfy language requirements.

An alternative to syntactic salt is generating compiler warnings when there is high probability that the code is a result of a mistake – a practice common in modern C/C++ compilers.

Syntactic saccharin 
Other extensions are syntactic saccharin and syntactic syrup, meaning gratuitous syntax that does not make programming any easier.

Sugared types 
Data types with core syntactic support are said to be "sugared types". Common examples include quote-delimited strings, curly braces for object and record types, and square brackets for arrays.

Notes

References 

 
 
 
 
 , reprinted in 
 

Programming language syntax
Computer jargon
Source code
Programming language design